The 2012 NCAA Division I men's ice hockey tournament involved sixteen schools in single-elimination play to determine the national champion of men's National Collegiate Athletic Association (NCAA) Division I college ice hockey for the 2011–12 season. The tournament began on March 23, 2012 with regional semifinals and ended on April 7 with the national championship game. The Boston College Eagles won their third national championship in five years, beating the Ferris State Bulldogs, 4–1, in the championship game. BC won nineteen consecutive games to end the season. It is the fifth title for both the program and head coach Jerry York – York previously coached Bowling Green to a championship in 1984.

Tournament procedure

The four regionals are officially named after their geographic areas.  The following are the sites for the 2012 regionals:
March 23 and 24
East Regional, Webster Bank Arena – Bridgeport, Connecticut (Hosts: Yale University and Fairfield University)
Midwest Regional, Resch Center – Green Bay, Wisconsin (Host: Michigan Technological University)
March 24 and 25
Northeast Regional, DCU Center – Worcester, Massachusetts (Host: College of the Holy Cross)
West Regional, Xcel Energy Center – Saint Paul, Minnesota (Host: University of Minnesota)

Each regional winner will advance to the Frozen Four:
April 5 and 7
Tampa Bay Times Forum – Tampa, Florida (Hosts: University of Alabama in Huntsville and the Tampa Bay Sports Commission)

Qualifying teams
The at-large bids and seeding for each team in the tournament were announced on March 18. The Central Collegiate Hockey Association (CCHA) had five teams receive a berth in the tournament, the Western Collegiate Hockey Association (WCHA) and Hockey East had four teams receive a berth, ECAC Hockey had two teams receive a berth, and Atlantic Hockey had one team receive a berth.

Number in parentheses denotes overall seed in the tournament.

Regionals

Northeast Regional – Worcester, Massachusetts

Note: * denotes overtime period(s)
All times are local (UTC−4).

Regional semifinals

Regional Final

Midwest Regional – Green Bay, Wisconsin
 

Note: * denotes overtime period(s)
All times are local (UTC−5).

Regional semifinals

Regional Final

East Regional – Bridgeport, Connecticut

Note: * denotes overtime period(s)
All times are local (UTC−4).

Regional semifinals

Regional Final

West Regional – Saint Paul, Minnesota

Note: * denotes overtime period(s)
All times are local (UTC−5).

Regional semifinals

Regional Final

Frozen Four – Tampa, Florida

National semifinals

National Championship

Record by conference

Media

Television
ESPN had US television rights to all games during the tournament. For the eighth consecutive year ESPN aired every game, beginning with the regionals, on ESPN, ESPN2, and ESPNU, and ESPN3. They also streamed them online via WatchESPN.

Broadcast Assignments
Regionals
East Regional: John Buccigross & Barry Melrose – Bridgeport, Connecticut
Midwest Regional: Ben Holden & Sean Ritchlin – Green Bay, Wisconsin
Northeast Regional: Joe Beninati & Billy Jaffe – Worcester, Massachusetts
West Regional: Clay Matvick & Dave Starman – St. Paul, Minnesota

Frozen Four & Championship
Gary Thorne, Barry Melrose, & Clay Matvick – Tampa, Florida

Radio
Dial Global Sports used exclusive radio rights to air both the semifinals and the championship, AKA the "Frozen Four."
Sean Grande & Cap Raeder

All-Tournament team

Frozen Four
G: Parker Milner* (Boston College)
D: Brian Dumoulin (Boston College)
D: Chad Billins (Ferris State)
F: Kyle Bonis (Ferris State)
F: Paul Carey (Boston College)
F: Steven Whitney (Boston College)
* Most Outstanding Player(s)

See also
2012 NCAA Division I Women's Ice Hockey Tournament

References

Tournament
NCAA Division I men's ice hockey tournament
NCAA Division I men's ice hockey tournament
NCAA Division I men's ice hockey tournament
NCAA Division I men's ice hockey tournament
NCAA Division I men's ice hockey tournament
NCAA Division I men's ice hockey tournament
NCAA Division I men's ice hockey tournament
21st century in Saint Paul, Minnesota
21st century in Tampa, Florida
History of Green Bay, Wisconsin
Ice hockey competitions in Worcester, Massachusetts
Ice hockey competitions in Tampa, Florida
Ice hockey competitions in Saint Paul, Minnesota
Ice hockey competitions in Wisconsin
Sports in Green Bay, Wisconsin
Ice hockey competitions in Minnesota